Westminster is a city and area of Central London, England, within the larger City of Westminster, most notable for being the seat of the majority of government institutions in the United Kingdom.

The area, which extends from the River Thames to Oxford Street, has many famous landmarks, including the Palace of Westminster, Buckingham Palace, Westminster Abbey, Westminster Cathedral, Trafalgar Square and much of the West End shopping and entertainment district.

The name originated from the informal description of the abbey church and royal peculiar of St Peter's (Westminster Abbey), west of the City of London (until the English Reformation there was also an Eastminster, near the Tower of London, in the East End of London). The abbey's origins date from between the 7th and 10th centuries, but it rose to national prominence when rebuilt by Edward the Confessor in the 11th. Westminster has been the home of England's government since about 1200, and from 1707 the Government of the United Kingdom. In 1539, it became a city.

Westminster is often used as a metonym to refer to the Parliament of the United Kingdom, in the Palace of Westminster.

Geography

Physical geography
The City and Liberty of Westminster and other Westminster administrative units (except the broader modern London Borough – known as the City of Westminster – created in 1965), extended from the River Thames to the old Roman Road from the City to western England, which is now locally called Oxford Street.

Thorney Island lay between the arms of the former River Tyburn at its confluence with the Thames, while the western boundary with Chelsea was formed by the similarly lost River Westbourne. The line of the river still forms (with very slight revisions) the boundaries of the modern borough with the Royal Borough of Kensington and Chelsea.

Further north, away from the river mouth, Westminster included land on both sides of the Westbourne, notably Knightsbridge (including the parts of Hyde Park west of the Serpentine lake – originally formed by damming the Serpentine – and most of Kensington Gardens).

Localities
Westminster includes the sub-districts of Soho, St James, Mayfair, Covent Garden, Pimlico, Victoria, Belgravia and Knightsbridge (shared with neighbouring Kensington).

Westminster merged with neighbouring Paddington and Marylebone in 1965 to form a larger modern borough, these neighbouring areas (except for a small area of Paddington in part of Kensington Gardens), lie north of Oxford Street.

Open spaces
The district's open spaces include:
 Hyde Park
 Kensington Gardens (part)
 Green Park
 Buckingham Palace Garden
 St James's Park

Origins and administration
The development of the area began with the establishment of the Abbey on a site then called Thorney Island, the choice of site may in part relate to the natural ford which is thought to have carried Watling Street over the Thames in the vicinity. The wider district became known as Westminster in reference to the church.

Legendary origin
The legendary origin is that in the early 7th century, a local fisherman named Edric (or Aldrich), ferried a stranger in tattered foreign clothing over the Thames to Thorney Island. It was a miraculous appearance of St Peter, a fisherman himself, coming to the island to consecrate the newly built church, which would subsequently develop into Westminster Abbey. He rewarded Edric with a bountiful catch when he next dropped his nets. Edric was instructed to present the King and St. Mellitus, Bishop of London, with a salmon and various proofs that the consecration had already occurred . Every year on 29 June, St Peters day, the Worshipful Company of Fishmongers presents the Abbey with a salmon in memory of this event.

Recorded origin
A charter of 785, possibly a forgery, grants land to the needy people of God in Thorney, in the dreadful spot which is called Westminster. The text suggests a pre-existing monastic community who chose to live in a very challenging location.

The recorded origins of the Abbey (rather than a less important religious site) date to the 960s or early 970s, when Saint Dunstan and King Edgar installed a community of Benedictine monks on the site.

Between 1042 and 1052, King Edward the Confessor began rebuilding St Peter's Abbey to provide himself with a royal burial church. It was the first church in England built in the Romanesque style. The building was completed around 1060 and was consecrated on 28 December 1065, only a week before Edward's death on 5 January 1066. A week later, he was buried in the church; and, nine years later, his wife Edith was buried alongside him. His successor, Harold II, was probably crowned in the abbey, although the first documented coronation is that of William the Conqueror later the same year.

The only extant depiction of Edward's abbey, together with the adjacent Palace of Westminster, is in the Bayeux Tapestry. Some of the lower parts of the monastic dormitory, an extension of the south transept, survive in the Norman Undercroft of the Great School, including a door said to come from the previous Saxon abbey. Increased endowments supported a community that increased from a dozen monks in Dunstan's original foundation, up to a maximum of about eighty monks.

Local government

Parish of Westminster St Margaret
Most of the parishes of Westminster originated as daughter parishes of St Margaret's parish, in the City and Liberty of Westminster, Middlesex. The exceptions to this were St Clement Danes, St Mary le Strand and possibly some other small areas.

The ancient parish was St Margaret; after 1727 this became the civil parish of 'St Margaret and St John', the latter a new church required for the increasing population. The area around Westminster Abbey formed the extra-parochial Close of the Collegiate Church of St Peter. Like many large parishes, Westminster was divided into smaller units called Hamlets (meaning a territorial sub-division, rather than a small village). These would later become independent daughter parishes.

Until 1900 the local authority was the combined vestry of St Margaret and St John (also known as the Westminster District Board of Works from 1855 to 1887), which was based at Westminster Town Hall in Caxton Street from 1883.

City and Liberty of Westminster
The Liberty of Westminster, governed by the Westminster Court of Burgesses, also included St Martin in the Fields and several other parishes and places. Westminster had its own quarter sessions, but the Middlesex sessions also had jurisdiction.

Metropolitan Borough of Westminster

Under local government reforms in 1889, the area fell within the newly created County of London, and the local government of Westminster was further reformed in 1900, when the court of burgesses and the parish vestries were abolished, and replaced by the Metropolitan Borough of Westminster. The borough was given city status at the same time, allowing it to be known as the City of Westminster and its council as Westminster City Council.

The City and Liberty of Westminster and the Metropolitan Borough of Westminster were very similar in extent, covering the parts of the wider modern City of Westminster south of the Oxford Street, and its continuations Hyde Park Place. The exception is that part of Kensington Gardens, south of that road, are part of Paddington.

Westminster merged with St Marylebone and Paddington in 1965, but the combined area was allowed to keep the title City of Westminster.

History
For a list of street name etymologies for Westminster see Street names of Westminster

Royal seat

The former Thorney Island, the site of Westminster Abbey, formed the historic core of Westminster. The abbey became the traditional venue of the coronations of the kings and queens of England from that of Harold Godwinson (1066) onwards.

From about 1200 the Palace of Westminster, near the abbey, became the principal royal residence, a transition marked by the transfer of royal treasury and financial records to Westminster from Winchester. Later the palace housed the developing Parliament and England's law courts. Thus London developed two focal points: the City of London (financial/economic) and Westminster (political and cultural).

The monarchs moved their principal residence to the Palace of Whitehall (1530–1698), then to St James's Palace in 1698, and eventually to Buckingham Palace and other palaces after 1762. The main law courts moved to the Royal Courts of Justice in the late-19th century.

Medieval and Tudor
The settlement grew up around the palace and abbey, as a service area for them. The parish church, St Margaret's Westminster served the wider community of the parish; the servants of the palace and abbey as well as the rural population and those associated with the high status homes developing on the road from the City. The area became larger and in the Georgian period became connected through urban ribbon development with the City along the Strand.

Henry VIII's Reformation in the early 16th century abolished the abbey and established a cathedral – thus the parish ranked as a "City", although it was only a fraction of the size of the City of London and the Borough of Southwark at that time.

Indeed, the cathedral and diocesan status of the church lasted only from 1539 to 1556, but the "city" status remained for a mere parish within Middlesex. As such it is first known to have had two Members of Parliament in 1545 as a new Parliamentary Borough, centuries after the City of London and Southwark were enfranchised.

Victorian divide

Charles Booth's poverty map showing Westminster in 1889 recorded the full range of income- and capital-brackets living in adjacent streets within the area; its central western area had become (by 1850) (the) Devil's Acre in the southern flood-channel ravine of the River Tyburn, yet Victoria Street and other small streets and squares had the highest colouring of social class in London: yellow/gold. Westminster has shed the abject poverty with the clearance of this slum and with drainage improvement, but there is a typical Central London property distinction within the area which is very acute, epitomised by grandiose 21st-century developments, architectural high-point listed buildings and nearby social housing (mostly non-council housing) buildings of the Peabody Trust founded by philanthropist George Peabody.

Wider uses of the name 
Given the focus on Westminster in English and British public life over centuries, the name "Westminster" is casually used as a metonym for the UK Parliament and for the political community of the United Kingdom generally. (The  civil service is similarly referred to using the name of the northern sub-neighbourhood which it inhabits, "Whitehall".) "Westminster" is consequently also used in reference to the Westminster system, the parliamentary model of democratic government that has evolved in the United Kingdom and for those other nations, particularly in the Commonwealth of Nations and for other parts of the former British Empire that adopted it.

The term "Westminster Village", sometimes used in the context of British politics, does not refer to a geographical area at all; employed especially in the phrase "Westminster Village gossip", it denotes a supposedly close social circle of members of parliament, political journalists, so-called spin-doctors and others connected to events in the Palace of Westminster and in Government ministries.

Economy
The area has a substantial residential population. By the 20th century Westminster saw rising numbers of residential apartments with wealthy inhabitants. Hotels, large Victorian homes and barracks exist near to Buckingham Palace.

High Commissions
Westminster hosts the High Commissions of many Commonwealth countries:

 Australia
 The Bahamas
 Brunei
 Canada
 Cyprus
 Eswatini
 Ghana
 India
 Lesotho
 Malaysia
 New Zealand
 Nigeria
 Pakistan
 Papua New Guinea
 Seychelles
 Singapore
 South Africa
 Trinidad and Tobago
 Uganda

Education
Within the area is Westminster School, a major public school which grew out of the abbey, and the University of Westminster, attended by over 20,000 students.

Notable people
 

Andy Bray (born 1981), cricketer
Alice Liddell (1852–1934), inspiration for Alice In Wonderland
Ava Gardner (24 December 1922 – 25 January 1990), American actress and singer
Arthur Barnby (1881–1937), first-class cricketer and Royal Marines/Royal Naval Air Service officer
Richard Colley (1833–1902), first-class cricketer and British Army officer
Geoffrey Cooke (1897–1980), first-class cricketer and British Army officer
John Fuller (1834–1893), first-class cricketer, clergyman and theologian
Hady Ghandour (born 2000), footballer
Tatiana Hambro (born 1989), fashion writer and editor
Tom Hiddleston (born 1981), Golden Globe-winning actor
Stephanie Leonidas (born 1982) - actress
Dua Lipa (born 1995), singer and songwriter
Edward Low (1690–1724), pirate during the latter days of the Golden Age of Piracy
Eddie Redmayne (born 1982), Oscar-winning actor
Quintin Twiss (1835–1900), first-class cricketer and stage actor

References

Notes

Bibliography

 Manchee, W. H. (1924), The Westminster City Fathers (the Burgess Court of Westminster) 1585–1901: Being some account of their powers and domestic rule of the City prior to its incorporation in 1901; with a foreword by Walter G. Bell and 36 illustrations which relate to documents (some pull-outs) and artefacts. London: John Lane (The Bodley Head).
 Davies, E. A. (1952), An Account of the Formation and Early Years of The Westminster Fire Office; (Includes black-and-white photographic plates with a colour frontispiece of 'A Waterman' and a foreword by Major K. M. Beaumont. London: Country Life Limited for the Westminster Fire Office.
 Hunting, P. (1981), Royal Westminster. The Royal Institution of Chartered Surveyors. Printed by Penshurst Press.  (paper);  (cased).

Further reading

External links

Westminster Borough Council
Westminster Walks – from Findlay Muirhead's 1927 guidebook to London and its Environs
Westminster, by Sir Walter Besant and Geraldine Edith Mitton and A. Murray Smith, 1902, from Project Gutenberg
Palmer's Village, a deserted village in Westminster

Districts of the City of Westminster
Areas of London
Market towns in London
Districts of London on the River Thames